Tim Lee Carter (September 2, 1910 – March 27, 1987) was an American politician serving as a Republican member of the United States House of Representatives for the Commonwealth of Kentucky from 1965 until 1981.

Background
Congressman Carter was born in Tompkinsville, Kentucky. He attended Western Kentucky State College (now Western Kentucky University) in Bowling Green, having pursued a pre-med curricula. Carter went on to earn his medical degree from the University of Tennessee in 1937. He served in the United States Army Medical Corps in World War II, traveling with the Thirty-Eighth Infantry for over three and a half years. He became a captain. Later Carter returned to practice medicine in Tompkinsville.

Election
In 1964, Carter sought the Republican nomination for Congress, following the retirement of Representative Eugene Siler.  Carter won the election over Democrat Frances Jones Mills and served in the U.S. House of Representatives until his retirement in 1981.  He was one of the few bright spots in a disastrous year for the GOP. However, he represented one of the few ancestrally Republican districts south of the Ohio River.  Voters in this region identified with the Republicans after the Civil War, and have supported the GOP through good times and bad ever since. Carter often joked that his congressional district stretched from "Fountain Run to Kingdom Come," a state park in Harlan County, at the eastern end of his district.

Vietnam war
In 1966, Congressman Carter was sent by President Johnson to Vietnam along with ten other war-veteran congressmen on a "Speaker's Committee."  Upon his return, he was asked by Johnson about his opinion of the state of the war.  Carter  went against the nine other delegates, stating: "No, Mr. President, you are not winning the war,".  Carter later came to be known as the first Republican Congressman to call for the end of the Vietnam War.  Rising before the U.S. House of Representatives on August 28, 1967, Carter stated "Let us now, while we are yet strong, bring our men home, every man jack of them.  The Vietcong fight fiercely and tenaciously because it is their land and we are foreigners intervening in their civil war.  If we must fight, let us fight in defense of our homeland and our own hemisphere."

Policies
Carter was considered a moderate-progressive Republican in Washington. Carter voted in favor of the Voting Rights Act of 1965 and the Civil Rights Act of 1968. As reported in a 1977 issue of Time magazine, Carter put forth the first Republican plan for national health insurance. Carter was appointed by President Nixon to the Shafer Commission, charged with making policy recommendations concerning drug abuse.  The Shafer Commission recommended decriminalizing simple marijuana possession, a policy President Nixon flatly refused.

Family
Tim Lee Carter's sister, Pearl Carter Pace was the first elected woman sheriff in Kentucky.  Pearl's and Tim Lee's father, James C. Carter Sr., served for 48 years as Circuit Judge in four counties of South Central Kentucky.  His son, James C. Carter Jr., served for 46 years as judge following his father.  Numerous other Carters have served in a wide range of public offices, both elective and appointive.

Pearl Pace was an avowed supporter and friend of U.S. President Dwight D. Eisenhower.  She served in his administration as Chair of the Foreign Claims Settlement Commission and was sometimes referred to as the second most powerful woman in Washington during her service, presumably after United States Secretary of Health, Education, and Welfare Oveta Culp Hobby of Texas.

Pearl's son, Stanley Carter Pace, was taken as a prisoner of war of the German Army during World War II.  He later rose to the Chairmanship of TRW, and, came out of retirement to return the giant defense contractor General Dynamics to viability.  The extended Carter family is still active in state and local politics in Monroe County, Kentucky.

A Carter nephew, M.C. "Doc" Keen of Burkesville, served as sheriff of Cumberland County and ran unsuccessfully for the Kentucky State Senate in the Republican primary held on May 29, 1973. The eventual winner was United Methodist minister Doug Moseley, a native of Bowling Green who then ran unopposed in the general election held on November 6, 1973.

Retirement
In 1980, Carter did not seek re-election. On his retirement, he returned to live in Tompkinsville, Kentucky, and remained active in local, state, and national politics until his death in 1987.

References

External links

Tim Lee Carter

1910 births
1987 deaths
United States Army personnel of World War II
People from Tompkinsville, Kentucky
Physicians from Kentucky
Republican Party members of the United States House of Representatives from Kentucky
United States Army Medical Corps officers
University of Tennessee alumni
Western Kentucky University alumni
20th-century American politicians